HMS Arun was a Laird Type River-class destroyer ordered by the Royal Navy under the 1902–1903 Naval Estimates. Named after the River Arun in southern England she was the first ship to carry this name in the Royal Navy.

Construction
She was laid down on 27 August 1902 at the Cammell Laird shipyard at Birkenhead and launched on 29 April 1903.  She was completed in February 1904.  Her original armament was to be the same as the turtleback torpedo boat destroyers that preceded her.  In 1906 the Admiralty decided to upgrade the armament by landing the five 6-pounder naval guns and shipping three 12-pounder 8 hundredweight (cwt) guns.  Two would be mounted abeam at the foc's'le break and the third gun would be mounted on the quarterdeck.

Pre-War
After commissioning she was assigned to the East Coast Destroyer Flotilla of the 1st Fleet and based at Harwich.

Decoy sank.

On 27 April 1908 the Eastern Flotilla departed Harwich for live fire and night manoeuvres. During these exercises the cruiser  rammed and sank the destroyer , then damaged the destroyer .

In April 1909 she was assigned to the 3rd Destroyer Flotilla of the 1st Fleet on its formation at Harwich.  She remained until displaced by a Basilisk-class destroyer by May 1912.  She went into reserve assigned to the 5th Destroyer Flotilla of the 2nd Fleet with a nucleus crew.

On 30 August 1912 the Admiralty directed all destroyer classes were to be designated by alpha characters starting with the letter 'A'.  The ships of the River class were assigned to the 'E'-class.  After 30 September 1913, she was known as an E-class destroyer and had the letter 'E' painted on the hull below the bridge area and on either the fore or aft funnel.

World War I
The 9th Flotilla was a patrol flotilla tasked with anti-submarine and counter mining patrols in the Firth of Forth area. Here she provided anti-submarine and counter mining patrols in defence of the main fleet anchorage.

In August 1915 with the amalgamation of the 7th and 9th Flotillas, she was redeployed to the 5th Destroyer Flotilla in the Mediterranean Fleet based at Alexandria. Here Arun was employed in escort of merchant ships, counter mining patrols and anti-submarine patrols in the Eastern Mediterranean Sea for the remainder of the war.

Disposition
In 1919 Arun returned to Home Waters and was paid off then laid up in reserve awaiting disposal.  On 30 June 1920 she was sold to Thos. W. Ward of Sheffield for breaking at Hayle, Cornwall.

She was not awarded a Battle Honour for her service.

Pennant numbers

References

Bibliography
 
 
 
 
 
 
 

 

River-class destroyers
1903 ships
Ships built on the River Mersey
Maritime incidents in 1904